LMC may refer to:

Places
 Large Magellanic Cloud, a galaxy

Facilities and structures
 Lok Ma Chau station, a railway station in Hong Kong
 La Macarena Airport (IATA: LMC)
 London Muslim Centre

Businesses and companies
 Logan Machine Company, a snowcat manufacturer
 Lordstown Motors Corporation
 Lincoln Motor Company
 Logical Machine Corporation, a defunct computer company

Education and schools
 Lake Michigan Catholic High School, Michigan, United States
 Lees–McRae College, North Carolina
 School of Literature, Media, and Communication, Georgia Institute of Technology, Atlanta, Georgia, United States
 Lon Morris College, Jacksonville, Texas
 Los Medanos College, Pittsburg, California

Entertainment and culture
 LMC (British band), an English dance group
 LM.C, a Japanese rock band
 London Musicians Collective, a UK charity for the promotion of experimental music

Organisations
 Lake Michigan Conference (Michigan), a high school athletic conference
 Latur Municipal Corporation
 Local Medical Committee, a UK statutory organisation representing general medical practitioners
 Lucknow Municipal Corporation, civic body that governs the city of Lucknow, India

Science and engineering
 Lateral motor column neuron
 Least material condition in geometric dimensioning and tolerancing
 Little man computer, an instructional model of a computer
 Local mate competition, a mechanism that affects sex allocation in evolutionary biology

Other
 Lower middle class
 Late Middle Chinese, the language of Chinese medieval rhyme tables

See also

 
 
 IMC (disambiguation)
 1MC, 1 Main Circuit
 LMCS (disambiguation)